Huángbò Xīyùn (died 850) was an influential master of Zen Buddhism during the Tang dynasty.

Huángbò was a disciple of  Baizhang Huaihai (720–840), and the teacher of Linji Yixuan (died 866) (Wade–Giles: Lin-chi I-hsüan; Japanese: Rinzai Gigen).

Biography

Sources
Very little about Huángbò's life is known for certain as, unlike other Transmission of the Lamp literature, there is no biographical information included with Huángbò's collection of sayings and sermons, the Ch’uan-hsin Fa-yao (Essentials of Mind Transmission) and the Wan-ling Lu (Record of Wan-ling: Japanese: Enryōroku).

He was born in Fuzhou, China. The records indicated that Huángbò was extraordinarily tall.

Monastic life
Huángbò began his monastic life on Mt. Huangbo in Fujian province, receiving the Buddhist name Xiyun (Hsi-yun). As was the custom of the times, he traveled around seeking instructions from various Chan masters. He visited Mt. Tiantai and sought teachings from the National Teacher Nanyang Huizhong (Wade–Giles: Nan-yang Hui-chung; Japanese: Nan’yō Echū). At some point he may also have studied under Nanquan Puyuan (748–835) (Wade–Giles: Nan-ch’üan P’u-yüan; Japanese: Nansen Fugan), a student of Mazu Daoyi (Wade–Giles: Ma-tsu Tao-i; Japanese: Baso Dōitsu) (709–788)

However, Huángbò's main teacher was Baizhang Huaihai (Wade–Giles: Pai-chang Huai-hai; Japanese: Hyakujo Ekai), another Mazu student, and it was from Baizhang that Huángbò received Dharma transmission. According to Yuanwu Keqin's commentary in The Blue Cliff Record, when Huángbò first met Baizhang, Baizhang exclaimed, “Magnificent! Imposing! Where have you come from?” Huángbò replied, “Magnificent and imposing, I’ve come from the mountains.”

Lung-hsing Monastery
In 842, a prominent government official in Kiangsi province, Pei Xiu (Wade–Giles: P’ei Hsiu) (787 or 797–860), invited Huángbò to take up residence at Lung-hsing Monastery. Pei was an ardent student of Chan and received teachings from Huángbò,  eventually building a monastery for Huángbò around 846, which the master named Huang-po after the mountain where he had been a novice monk.

Death
Before Huángbò died, he named thirteen successors, the most prominent of which was Linji Yixuan. He was given the posthumous title (probably under the urging of Pei Xiu who became chief minister of the central government in 853) of “Chan Master Without Limits” (Tuan Chi Ch’an Shih).

John Blofeld says he died on Mount Huangbo during the T'ai Chung reign of the Tang dynasty, or between 847 and 859. Blofeld says his memorial pagoda is "The Tower of Spacious Karma" and that it was Emperor Hsüan Tsung who gave him the title "The Zen Master Who Destroys All Limitations".

Teachings

Sources
What is known of Huángbò's teachings comes from two texts, the Ch’uan-hsin Fa-yao (Essential of Mind Transmission) and the Wan-ling Lu (Record of Wan-ling: Japanese: Enryōroku) written by Huángbò's student, Pei Xiu. Pei compiled the teachings from his own notes and sent the manuscript to the senior monks on Mount Huangbo for further editing and emendation.

The “official” version of the Huángbò literature was published as part of the Transmission of the Lamp, Compiled during the Ching-te Period, in 1004. The record of Huángbò is more or less equally split between sermons by the master and question and answer dialogues between the master and his disciples and lay people.

One Mind
Huángbò's teaching centered on the concept of “mind” (Chinese: hsin), a central issue for Buddhism in China for the previous two centuries or more. He taught that mind cannot be sought by the mind. One of his most important sayings was “mind is the Buddha”. He said: 

He also said: 

He also firmly rejected all dualism, especially between the “ordinary” and “enlightened” states:

Tathāgatagarbha
Since all is Buddha-mind, all actions reflect the Buddha, are actions of a Buddha. Huángbò's teaching on this reflected the Indian concept of the tathāgatagarbha, the idea that within all beings is the nature of the Buddha. Therefore, Huángbò taught that seeking the Buddha was futile as the Buddha resided within: 

Huángbò was adamant that any form of “seeking” was not only useless, but obstructed clarity: 

Furthermore, he claimed that

Non-attachment to written texts
According to the accounts, Huángbò avoided clinging to written texts. This is exemplified by the following story:
Pei Xiu presented Huángbò with a text he had written on his understanding of Chan.
Huángbò placed the text down without looking at and after a long pause asked, “Do you understand?”
Pei Xiu replied, “I don’t understand.”
Huángbò said, “If it can be understood in this manner, then it isn’t the true teaching. If it can be seen in paper and ink, then it’s not the essence of our order.” 

What Huángbò knew was that students of Chan often became attached to “seeking” enlightenment and he constantly warned against this (and all attachment) as an obstruction to enlightenment: 

Although Huángbò often cautioned students against dependence on textual practices, pointing to the necessity of direct experience over sutra study, his record shows that he was familiar with a wide selection of Buddhist doctrines and texts, including the Diamond Sutra, the Vimalakīrti Sutra and the Lotus Sutra.

Hitting and shouting
Huángbò was also noted for the manner of his teaching, incorporating the hitting and shouting pioneered by Mazu. There are a number of instances in the record of Huángbò slapping students.

The Blue Cliff Record tells the story of the future emperor of China, hiding in the Chan community as a novice monk, receiving slaps from Huángbò for questioning why Huángbò was bowing to an image of the Buddha.

The most famous instance was when Linji Yixuan was directed by the head monk, Muzhou Daoming, to question Huángbò on the meaning of Buddhism after Linji had been practicing in Huángbò's monastery for three years without an interview. Three times Linji went to Huángbò and three times the only answer he got was a slap.

His apparent disrespect was extended to his own position:

Overcoming fear
While Huángbò was an uncompromising and somewhat fearsome Chan teacher, he understood the nature of fear in students when they heard the doctrine of emptiness and the Void: 

He taught that "no activity" was the gateway of his Dharma but that

Notes

References

Sources

External links

 Huang Po - Biography and Poems
 Dale S. Wright, The Huang-po Literature

Chan Buddhist monks
Tang dynasty Buddhist monks
850 deaths
Chinese Zen Buddhists
Year of birth unknown